Road routes in Victoria assist drivers navigating roads throughout the state, as roads may change names several times between destinations, or have a second local name in addition to a primary name. There are two main route numbering schemes in use: numeric shields, and alphanumeric routes, with the former being replaced by the latter. The original scheme consists of numbered National Highways, National Routes, Metropolitan and State Routes, each identified with a different shield-shaped route marker. The alphanumeric Statewide Route Numbering Scheme, introduced in the 1990s, has replaced the previous scheme outside Melbourne, and some routes within Melbourne. It consists of alphanumeric routes, which are a one-to-three digit number prefixed with a letter – M, A, B, or C – that denotes the grade and importance of the road.

History

Route numbers have been allocated to Victoria's roads since 1954, with the introduction of National Routes across all states and territories in Australia, symbolised by a white shield with black writing; National Route 1 ('Highway 1') was one of the best-known numbered national routes, due to its fame for circumnavigating the continent.

To supplement the National Route number system, a new route numbering scheme (now known as the Metropolitan Route Numbering Scheme) allocated blue-and-white shields across Melbourne in 1965, numbered to fit around existing National Routes; Freeway Routes, using green shields to better mark their specialised status, were spun off from this system between 1970 and 1987.

In 1974, the National Highway network was defined, which allowed some existing National Routes to be upgraded to National Highways. These were marked with the same shield design as the National Routes, except for their gold-on-green colouring and the word NATIONAL added across the top. 

A shield system covering regional Victoria (the State Route Numbering Scheme) was introduced in 1985, marking out urban arterial routes and secondary rural highways. The Metropolitan Route Numbering Scheme across Melbourne received a major refurbishment in the late 1980s, with the creation of Tourist Routes as a result.

Beginning in late 1996, regional Victoria (and certain core routes through Melbourne) began to replace their system of National Routes, National Highways and State Routes with an alphanumeric route numbering system, called the Statewide Route Numbering Scheme. Many existing numbered routes were allocated a letter (M, A, B or C) in addition to its number, with 'M' routes denoting freeways, 'A' routes denoting routes of national significance, 'B' routes denoting routes of state significance, and 'C' routes acting as local access roads. Instead of shields, route numbers are displayed as yellow text on green rectangular backgrounds, and has now - with the exception of Tourist Routes - become the sole route numbering system in regional Victoria. The Great Ocean Road (signed B100) and Great Alpine Road (signed B500) were the first routes allocated, and with conversion beginning to the M1, in late 1996; signing work had been completed for all 'M' and 'A' class roads and for approximately half of the 'B' class roads throughout Victoria by the end of June 1998. Former National Highways route markers initially retained their shield design (including NATIONAL markings) after conversion, but VicRoads - as of September 2013 - removed them, bringing their design in line with the rest of the state.

Melbourne has been slower to convert between systems, having kept most of its Metropolitan routes, but is currently undergoing a systematic conversion from 2020. Routes listed here may change as a result.

Alphanumeric Routes

M routes
M roads provide a consistent high standard of driving conditions, with divided carriageways, at least four traffic lanes, sealed shoulders and line-marking that is easily visible in all weather conditions. M roads are the primary road links connecting Melbourne and other capital cities and major provincial centres. In practice, this means M roads are usually at least dual-carriageway freeways or high standard rural highways with at least two lanes in each direction. Victorian route allocations use a blue background colour to designate a toll-road (sections attracting a toll are specifically marked).

A routes
A roads provide a similar high standard of driving conditions usually on a single carriageway, but in practice this means usually a dual-carriageway road within suburban Melbourne. A roads serve the same purpose as M roads, but carry less traffic.

B routes
B roads are sealed roads wide enough to accommodate two lanes of traffic with good centre line markings, provide adequate shoulders and high quality and visibility signage. B roads are the primary transport links for major regions not connected by either M or A roads, as well as major tourist routes.

C routes
C roads are generally sealed two-lane roads with shoulders and serve as important links between population centres and the primary transport network.

C101 to C198

C203 to C298

C305 to C392

C401 to C498

C505 to C655

C701 to C794

C801 to C996

See also

List of road routes in the Australian Capital Territory
List of road routes in New South Wales
List of road routes in the Northern Territory
List of road routes in Queensland
List of road routes in South Australia
List of road routes in Tasmania
List of road routes in Western Australia
List of highways in Victoria
Road transport in Victoria

References

Victoria
 
Road routes